Gaduggayi is a 1989 Indian Telugu-language comedy film directed by Sarath. It stars Rajendra Prasad and Rajani, with music composed by Chakravarthy.

Plot
The film begins in a village where Gopi / Pandu a callow raised by his grandparents Bhushayya and Parvathamma. He always performs naughty deeds which irk local moneylender Papa Rao who suffers the people providing loans even Bhushayya is one of them. Parallelly, in the city, Amala daughter of a millionaire Koteswara Rao supposed to be the niece of Papa Rao. Once she visits the village where her acquaintance with Gopi begins with petty quarrels. Later on, she starts liking him after protecting her against harm. Meanwhile, Koteswara Rao dies out of a heart attack, entrusting the entire property to Amala and assigning her responsibility to his Lawyer friend Chidanandam. Right now, Amala is surrounded by many relatives, her younger maternal uncle Gandabherundam and paternal aunt Kanthamma who plot to usurp her wealth by coupling with their sons Prasad & Buchi respectively. 

Aside, Bhushayya looks like a match for Gopi when Papa Rao intrigues and spoils it by posing Gopi as a drunkard. Humiliated Bhushayya badly hits Gopi and throws him out. Frustrated Gopi reaches the city where Lawyer Chidanandam shelters him. Eventually, Amala too finds him who civilizes and makes him an allrounder. Thereafter, she appoints him as her secretary and accords the freehand. Soon, Gopi starts teasing Gandabherundam and Kanthamma. After a few comic incidents, in the village, Papa Rao sells off Bhushayya's house and necks them out when the couple moves in search of Gopi. Here Gandabherundam could not admit the dominance of Gopi, so, he calls Papa Rao who recognizes him. At present, they ruse by kidnaping Bhushayya and Parvathamma and blackmails Gopi to discard Amala's life which he does so. Ahead, Gandabherundam makes arrangements for Prasad & Amala's espousal. At that point, Kanthamma is deserted by them when she immediately approaches Gopi and declares Koteswara Rao's death as a murder made by Gandabherundam & Prasad. At last, Gopi ceases their plan and protects his grandparents. Finally, the movie ends on a happy note with the marriage of Gopi & Amala.

Cast

Rajendra Prasad as Gopi / Pandu
Rajani as Amala
Satyanarayana as Bhushayya
Gollapudi Maruti Rao as Gandabherundam 
Kota Srinivasa Rao as Papa Rao
Allu Ramalingaiah as Lawyer Chidanandam
Suthi Velu as Babji
Raavi Kondala Rao as Suryam Master
Prasad Babu as Prasad
Bhimeswara Rao as Koteswara Rao
Potti Prasad as Panakalu
Ramana Reddy as Buchi
Pandari Bai as Parvathi
Suryakantham as Kanthamma
Tatineni Rajeswari as Lakshmi
Kuyili as Mangi

Music 
Music was composed by Chakravarthy. Lyrics were written by Veturi.

Reception 
K. Ram writing for Andhra Patrika on 21 August 1989, stated that director Sharath, has filled the film with comedy with a good dosage of stunts and suspense.

References

External links

 

Indian comedy films
1980s Telugu-language films
Films directed by Sarath
Films scored by K. Chakravarthy
1989 comedy films
1989 films